Michael Sopkiw is an American former actor who starred in four Italian B movies in two years. He was born in 1954 in Connecticut.

Sopkiw took modeling jobs, and he was employed in Italy by filmmaker Sergio Martino to star in 2019, After the Fall of New York (1983). Lamberto Bava (the son of famous movie-maker Mario Bava) then recruited Sopkiw in order to shoot two movies in the United States, Blastfighter (1984) and Monster Shark (1984). He finally ended his film career in Massacre in Dinosaur Valley (1985) by Michele Massimo Tarantini.

His movie career being unsuccessful, Michael gave up acting and went to study medicinal plant science. He launched a company, MIRON Violettglas, in California where he imports and distributes special glass bottles designed to protect the contents from the sun.

References

External links

Male actors from Connecticut
American male film actors
1954 births
Living people
American people of Ukrainian descent
American people of Italian descent